Richard Carl Ntiru (born 1946) is a Ugandan poet and editor. His only collection of poetry is Tensions (1971), which is rich in imagery reminiscent of the poetry of Christopher Okigbo and Paul Ndu. Ntiru deals with issues of contemporary East Africa and while he acknowledges other poets in other literatures, he consciously explores the divisions within human society and critiques his society's attitudes towards the unfortunate. Apart from poetry he has also written a radio play and short stories, and his poems "If it is true", and "The miniskirt" are included in The Penguin Book of Modern African Poetry (1999).

Early life and education
Richard Ntiru was born near Kisoro in Kigezi District, in south-western Uganda. He was educated at Ntare School in Mbarara. In 1968, he joined Makerere University college where he studied English and edited the university magazine, The Makererean, as well as the campus journal of creative writing, Pen point. He also managed the Makerere travelling theatre. For many years, Ntiru worked as an editor with publishing companies and research organisations in East Africa, including the now defunct East African Publishing House.

Published works

Poetry collection

Poems
"The miniskirt" and "If it is true",in 
"Modena", "The pauper", "To the living" and "Virgine Madre",in 
 "First rains", in Zuka 1–4 (Oxford University Press) 1967.
 "Introduction"

References

External links 

Living people
1946 births
20th-century Ugandan poets
Ugandan writers
Makerere University alumni
Ugandan male poets
20th-century male writers